KMVX (101.9 FM, "Mix 101.9") is an American radio station licensed to Monroe, Louisiana, United States. The station, established in 1967, is currently owned by The Radio People and the broadcast license is held by Holladay Broadcasting of Louisiana, LLC.    Studios are located in Monroe, and its transmitter is located in rural Caldwell Parish, Louisiana.

Programming
KMVX broadcasts an urban adult contemporary music format to Monroe and the greater Alexandria, Louisiana area and Natchez Mississippi.  Local weekday on-air personalities include Rickey Smiley, Rob Lloyd, DJ Scott Banks,

History
The station, under the KNOE-FM call sign, was founded in 1966 by former Governor of Louisiana James A. Noe.  Noe had earlier started Monroe AM radio station KNOE in 1944 and Monroe TV station KNOE-TV in 1953. In 1936, he also acquired an AM radio station in New Orleans which he renamed WNOE and in 1968 started New Orleans FM radio station WNOE-FM.

Noe's son, James Albert "Jimmie" Noe Jr., ran KNOE-FM along with its AM and TV sister stations for almost four decades.  When Jimmie Noe died from cancer in 2005, the remaining family members agreed to place the stations up for sale and exit broadcasting.  In October 2007, the Noe family reached an agreement to sell this station to Clay Holladay's Radio Monroe, LLC., for a reported $900,000.  The deal was approved by the FCC on May 1, 2008, and the transaction was consummated on May 13, 2008.

On March 3, 2013 KNOE-FM changed its format from CHR to urban adult contemporary, branded as "Mix 101.9". The call letters were changed to KMVX on March 21, 2013.

Tower collapse
On March 21, 1997, KNOE-FM suffered a catastrophic collapse of its broadcast tower.  The 1,989 foot (606.25 m) tower, roughly 545 feet (166 m) taller than Chicago's Sears Tower, collapsed as a result of a maintenance crew's failure to install a temporary support structure during the replacement of diagonal braces.  Of the three workers on the tower at the time of the collapse, one was killed, one fell into a satellite dish about 12 feet (3.7 m) above the ground, and one was thrown clear and walked away basically unharmed. The workers were together about 200 feet (61 m) up the tower when it collapsed.  The tower, whose primary tenant was then-sister station KNOE-TV, was also used by Louisiana Public Broadcasting.  After operating from temporary facilities for more than a year, KNOE-FM's permanent replacement tower was ready for use in June 1998 and licensed for operation by the FCC on September 15, 1998.

Star 101.9 

Star 101.9 as KNOE-FM with Top-40 Hit's

References

External links 

Radio stations in Louisiana
Radio stations established in 1967
Mass media in Monroe, Louisiana
Urban adult contemporary radio stations in the United States
The Radio People radio stations